Rezachal Kenar (also Romanized as Rez̤āchāl Kenār) is a village in Abezhdan Rural District, Abezhdan District, Andika County, Khuzestan Province, Iran. At the 2006 census, its population was 200, in 36 families.

References 

Populated places in Andika County